Barry Cunningham (born 1965/6) is an Irish former Gaelic footballer who played for Na Cealla Beaga and the Donegal county team. As of 2009, he was a quantity surveyor.

Inter-county
Cunningham won the 1987 All-Ireland Under-21 Football Championship with Donegal.

He was a member of Donegal's 1992 All-Ireland Senior Football Championship winning panel. He played as a midfielder and came on as a substitute for calf injury victim Brian Murray in the second half of the 1992 All-Ireland Final as Donegal defeated Dublin by a scoreline of 0–18 to 0–14.

Club
At club level he played for Na Cealla Beaga. He won five Donegal Senior Football Championships—1988, 1991, 1992, 1995 and 1996. In 1991 he reached the final of the Ulster Senior Club Football Championship.

References

External links
Barry Cunningham at GAAinfo.com

1960s births
Living people
Donegal inter-county Gaelic footballers
Killybegs Gaelic footballers
Quantity surveyors
Winners of one All-Ireland medal (Gaelic football)